The 1957–58 Cypriot Second Division was the fifth season of the Cypriot second-level football league. Orfeas Nicosia won their 1st title.

Format
Nine teams participated in the 1956–57 Cypriot Second Division. The league was split to two geographical groups, depending from Districts of Cyprus each participated team came from. All teams of a group played against each other twice, once at their home and once away. The team with the most points at the end of the season crowned group champions. The winners of each group were playing against each other in the final phase of the competition and the winner were the champions of the Second Division. The champion was promoted to 1958–59 Cypriot First Division, but because was not held, the champions promoted to 1959–60 Cypriot First Division.

Teams received two points for a win, one point for a draw and zero points for a loss.

Changes from previous season
Teams promoted to 1957–58 Cypriot First Division
 Apollon Limassol

New members of CFA
 Amathus Limassol
 Enosis Agion Omologiton

Furthermore, Antaeus Limassol was dissolved.

Stadiums and locations

Limassol-Larnaca-Paphos Group
Champions was Panellinios Limassol.

Nicosia-Famagusta-Keryneia Group
Champions was Orfeas Nicosia.

Champions Playoffs 
Orfeas Nicosia won twice Panellinios Limassol with 2–0 and 2–1. Orfeas Nicosia were the champions of the Second Division. Orfeas Nicosia promoted to Cypriot First Division.

See also
 Cypriot Second Division
 1957–58 Cypriot First Division

References

Cypriot Second Division seasons
Cyprus
1957–58 in Cypriot football